"The Court of the Crimson King", sometimes billed "In the Court of the Crimson King", is the fifth and final track from the British progressive rock band King Crimson's debut album, In the Court of the Crimson King. Released as a single, it reached No. 80 on the Billboard Hot 100 chart, the only King Crimson single to chart on the Hot 100.

Background
The track is dominated by a distinct riff performed on the mellotron. The main part of the song is split up into four stanzas, divided by an instrumental section called "The Return of the Fire Witch". The song climaxes at seven minutes, but continues with a little reprise, called "The Dance of the Puppets", before ending on an abrupt and free time scale. The music was composed by Ian McDonald, and the lyrics were written by Peter Sinfield.

The track was used in the 2006 film Children of Men.

Personnel
 Robert Fripp – guitars
 Greg Lake – bass guitar, lead vocals
 Ian McDonald – Mellotron, harpsichord, organ, flute, calliope, backing vocals
 Michael Giles – drums, percussion, backing vocals
 Peter Sinfield – lyrics

Charts

References

King Crimson songs
1969 debut singles
Songs with lyrics by Peter Sinfield
Songs written by Ian McDonald (musician)
Song recordings produced by Greg Lake
1969 songs
Island Records singles
Atlantic Records singles
Song recordings produced by Ian McDonald (musician)
Rock ballads

he:In the Court of the Crimson King#The Court of the Crimson King